Santa Cecilia Tower ( or ta' Santa Ċilja) is a tower in Għajnsielem, Gozo, Malta. It was built in 1613 by a member of the Order of St. John, and it could relay messages across the island. Today, the tower is in good condition and it is a private residence.

History
Santa Cecilia Tower was built in 1613 by Fra Bernardo Macedonia, Commander of Artillery of the Order of St. John. It got its name from the nearby Santa Cecilia Chapel, which is the oldest surviving chapel on Gozo. The chapel eventually became an ancillary building to the tower.

The tower was able to communicate with the batteries at Ramla Bay as well as Mġarr ix-Xini Tower, so it could relay messages across Gozo. It was also able to provide refuge for the local population in case of a corsair raid.

Today, the tower is a private residence. It was included on the Antiquities List of 1925. The tower is now scheduled as a Grade 1 monument, and it is also listed on the National Inventory of the Cultural Property of the Maltese Islands.

Architecture
Santa Cecilia Tower is a small rectangular structure. It is rather plain, but it has finials and other decorative features.

References

Fortified towers in Malta
Towers completed in 1613
Fortified houses in Malta
Xewkija
Għajnsielem
Limestone buildings in Malta
National Inventory of the Cultural Property of the Maltese Islands
1613 establishments in Malta
17th-century fortifications